Sumter is a city in and the county seat of Sumter County, South Carolina, United States. Known as the Sumter Metropolitan Statistical Area, the namesake county adjoins Clarendon and Lee to form the core of Sumter-Lee-Clarendon Tri-county (or East Midlands) area of South Carolina that includes three counties straddling the border of the Sandhills (or Midlands), Pee Dee, and Lowcountry regions. The population was 43,463 at the 2020 census.

History 
Incorporated as Sumterville in 1845, the city's name was shortened to Sumter in 1855.  It has grown and prospered from its early beginnings as a plantation settlement. The city and county of Sumter bear the name of General Thomas Sumter, the "Fighting Gamecock" of the American Revolutionary War.

During the Civil War, the town was an important supply and railroad repair center for the Confederacy. After the war, Sumter grew and prospered, using its large railroad network to supply cotton, timber, and by the start of the 20th century, tobacco to the region.

During the 20th century, Sumter grew into a major industrial center.  Still a unique business founded in 1923, Palmetto Pigeon Plant has grown into one of the largest producers of squab, poussin (chicken), cornish game hen, and silkie chickens in the world. Starting with the opening of Shaw Air Force Base (now home to the 9th Air Force, 20th Fighter Wing, and United States Army Central) in 1941, industry grew, especially after World War II. Sumter became increasingly known for textiles, manufacturing, biotech industries, a thriving retail environment, and medical center of its region in addition to agricultural products, which makes it a hub for business in the east-central portion of South Carolina.

Local sites listed on the National Register of Historic Places include:
 J. Clinton Brogdon House
 Carnegie Public Library
 Heriot-Moise House
 Charles T. Mason House
 Myrtle Moor
 O'Donnell House
 Rip Raps Plantation
 Salem Black River Presbyterian Church
 Henry Lee Scarborough House
 Stateburg Historic District
 Sumter County Courthouse
 Sumter Historic District
 Sumter Town Hall-Opera House
 Temple Sinai
 Elizabeth White House
 Lincoln High School
 Singleton's Graveyard
 Goodwill Parochial School, Gable, SC (Sumter County)

Geography and climate

Known as the Gamecock City, Sumter lies near the geographic center of the state of South Carolina at  (33.926942, -80.363541). Sumter is 100 miles west of Myrtle Beach's Grand Strand and 175 miles east of the Blue Ridge Mountains. Columbia, the state capital, is about 45 miles to the west, and Charleston is around 100 miles to the south. According to the United States Census Bureau, the city has a total area of 26.8 square miles (69.3 km2), of which 26.6 square miles (68.9 km2) are land and 0.2 square mile (0.4 km2) (0.60%) is covered by water.

Demographics

2020 census

As of the 2020 United States Census, there were 43,463 people, 15,605 households, and 9,925 families residing in the city.

2010 census
As of the census of 2010,  40,541 people, 16,232 households, and 10,049 families resided in the city. The population density was 575.6/km2 (1,491.2/mi2). The 16,032 housing units averaged 232.8/km2 (603.0/mi2). The racial makeup of the city was 47.07% Caucasian, 47.03% Black, 0.23% Native American, 1.27% Asian, 0.07% Pacific Islander, 1.12% from other races, and 1.41% from two or more races. Hispanics or Latinos of any race were 2.37% of the population.

Of the 14,564 households,h 35.6% had children under the age of 18 living with them, 46.0% were married couples living together, 19.3% had a female householder with no husband present, and 31.0% were not families. About 27.3% of all households were made up of individuals, and 11.7% had someone living alone who was 65 years of age or older. The average household size was 2.57 and the average family size was 3.14.

In the city, the population was distributed as 27.8% under the age of 18, 12.5% from 18 to 24, 28.2% from 25 to 44, 17.9% from 45 to 64, and 13.5% who were 65 years of age or older. The median age was 32 years. For every 100 females, there were 89.2 males. For every 100 females age 18 and over, there were 83.9 males.

The median income for a household in the city was $31,590, and for a family was $38,668. Males had a median income of $27,078 versus $22,002 for females. The per capita income for the city was $16,949. About 13.0% of families and 16.6% of the population were below the poverty line, including 21.8% of those under age 18 and 15.3% of those age 65 or over.

Government and Law

Sumter adopted the council-manager form of government on June 11, 1912.  The city council appoints a city manager to serve as chief administrative officer to run the day-to-day business of the city.  This individual serves at the pleasure of the council.  A mayor is elected to serve as the chairman of the city council; both the mayor and the councilmen serve four-year terms.

Six councilmen, who are not subject to term limits, are elected by ward, whereas the mayor is elected at-large. Sumter City Council is responsible for making policies and enacting laws, rules, and regulations to provide for future community and economic growth. The council is also responsible for providing the necessary support for the orderly and efficient operation of city services.

Martha Priscilla Shaw, who was Sumter's first female mayor from 1952 to 1956, was also the first woman to serve as a mayor in South Carolina.

Education
There is one school district—Sumter School District—which serves both the City of Sumter and the rest of Sumter County.

Sumter is home to Crestwood High School, Lakewood High School, and Sumter High School. Each public school is accredited by the Southern Association of Colleges and Schools and the State Department of Education.  The area also includes the private institutions of Thomas Sumter Academy, Wilson Hall, Sumter Christian School, St. Anne Catholic School, St. Francis Xavier High School, Berea Junior Academy, and Westside Christian Academy.

Higher education
Sumter is home to several collegiate institutions. The area is served by Morris College (a historically black (HBCU) private, four-year liberal arts college); Central Carolina Technical College (a public two-year technical college); and the University of South Carolina Sumter.

Library
Sumter has a public library system that includes three branches of the Sumter County Library network.

Shaw Air Force Base
Sumter is home to Shaw Air Force Base, headquarters of the United States Air Forces Central Command, United States Army Central, 15th Air Force, the 20th Fighter Wing, and many other tenant units. Since World War II, it has been a major source of federal and civilian employment in the area.

Shaw's fighter planes consist of the F-16 Fighting Falcon, which is a versatile multirole fighter. F-16s dispatched from Shaw were the primary fighters used in the Gulf War. In response to the city's service, presidents from Dwight D. Eisenhower through Barack Obama have visited the city and base. The base was named in honor of 1st Lt. Ervin David Shaw, one of the early Americans to fly combat missions in World War I.

Mass transit
The Santee-Wateree Regional Transit Authority (SWRTA) is responsible for operating mass transit in greater Sumter area. The transit department is in connection with Shaw Air Force Base. SWRTA operates express shuttles and a bus service serving Sumter and the communities within the county. The authority was established in October 2002 after SCANA released ownership of public transportation back to the City of Sumter. Since 2003, SWRTA provides transportation for more than 10,000 passengers, has expanded route services, and introduced 15 new ADA accessible buses offering a safer, more comfortable means of transportation. In recent years, SWRTA added natural gas-powered buses to its small fleet, and has plans to expand.

Roads and highways

Interstates

US routes

South Carolina state highways

Swan Lake Iris Gardens 
Swan Lake Iris Gardens is the only public park in the United States containing all eight known species of swan. The lake is dotted with islands and wildlife. The park is also home to some of the nation's most intensive plantings of Japanese Iris, which bloom yearly in mid to late May and last until the beginning of June. The garden is also planted with camellias, azaleas, day lilies, and Japanese magnolias. A Braille Trail enables the sight-impaired to enjoy the scents and sensations of the gardens.

This area was first developed in 1927 as a private fishing retreat by Hamilton Carr Bland, a local businessman. They failed miserably, and after consulting expert horticulturists from as far away as New York, he ordered his gardener to dig up the bulbs and dump them at the swamp. The following spring, they burst into bloom.

The park is host to events and festivals throughout the year, including the annual "Iris Festival" which is held every Memorial Day weekend in May. The gardens also host a Christmas event with the nighttime Fantasy of Lights display, featuring more than 1,000,000 varicolored lights. It also hosts an annual Earth Day celebration.

Sports
Riley Park is a 2,000-seat stadium primarily used for baseball, and was the home of Sumter Braves, a Single A Atlanta Braves affiliate that competed in the South Atlantic League. Riley Park was home to the Braves from 1985 until 1990, when the team left Sumter for Macon, Georgia. Notable Sumter Braves who went on to Major League success include Tom Glavine, David Justice, Kevin Brown (right-handed pitcher), Mark Wohlers, Ryan Klesko, and Vinny Castilla. The Braves were replaced by the Sumter Flyers in 1991, a Single A Montreal Expos affiliate. The Flyers, however, left Sumter after one season. No professional baseball team has competed in Sumter since the end of the 1991 season.

Riley continues to be the home of the P-15s, an American Legion baseball team with a long history of success. The P-15s have won 15 state titles including in 1940, 1950, 1952, 1962, 1977, 1991, 1992, 1993, 1994, 1999, 2005, 2006, 2008, 2009, and 2011. They advanced to the 2006 American Legion World Series in Cedar Rapids, Iowa where they finished fourth nationally.  The P-15s made a return trip to the American Legion World Series hosted by Shelby, NC in 2008 and 2009.

Palmetto Tennis Center is a new state-of-the-art tennis court in Palmetto Park. The tennis center has 24 official size tennis courts. It hosts numerous youth, collegiate, and professional tournaments each year.  Sumter Memorial Stadium is home to Sumter High School's Gamecocks, Marvin Montgomery Field at Donald L. Crolley Memorial Stadium is home to the Crestwood High School Knights, and Dr. J. Frank Baker Stadium is home to the Lakewood High School Gators.

In the 1950s, Sumter was very strong in table tennis state champions, and in 1951, produced an All-American Table Tennis Tournament national men's champion Oliver Hoyt Stubbs.

New York Yankees former second baseman Bobby Richardson is from Sumter.  The town built and named a youth baseball park in his honor.  Sumter is also the home of pro basketball star Ray Allen, who had an 18-year career in the NBA.

Jordan Blackmon Montgomery (born December 27, 1992), nicknamed "Gumby", is an American professional baseball pitcher for the New York Yankees of Major League Baseball (MLB). He made his MLB debut in 2017. Before his professional career, Montgomery played college baseball for the South Carolina Gamecocks of the University of South Carolina.

Notable people

Artists
 Monica Helms, creator of Transgender Pride flag.
 Jasper Johns, painter, sculptor, and printmaker.
 Grainger McKoy, artist in wood and metal sculpture.
Athletics/Competition
 Ray Allen, professional basketball player, 10-time NBA All-Star.
 Art Baker, collegiate football coach.
 Justin Bethel, NFL defensive back.
 Ronnie Burgess, NFL defensive back.
 Pete Chilcutt, played basketball for University of North Carolina and NBA from 1991 to 2000.
 Buck Flowers (Allen Ralph Flowers Jr., football player.
 Nicole Gamble, track and field triple jump champion.
 Terry Kinard, NFL player, first-round draft pick of New York Giants, played in 1986 Super Bowl.
 Wayne Mass, Edmunds High School player, All American at Clemson & then played in the NFL.
 Bob Montgomery, former lightweight boxing champion.
 Jordan Montgomery, Major League Baseball pitcher for the New York Yankees.
 JP Sears (baseball), Major League Baseball pitcher for the New York Yankees.
 Ja Morant, professional basketball player, was the 2nd overall pick in the 2019 NBA draft by the Memphis Grizzlies.
 Cleveland Pinkney, professional football player, Tampa Bay Buccaneers, Carolina Panthers and Detroit Lions.  
 Matt Price, former pitcher that won back to back College World Series titles with the University of South Carolina Gamecocks.  Holds the record for most wins in the College World Series. Played in the Baltimore Orioles' farm system.
 Jason Ratcliff, NASCAR crew chief for Matt Kenseth at Joe Gibbs Racing.
 Bobby Richardson, second baseman, three-time World Series champion with New York Yankees, baseball coach at South Carolina.
 Wally Richardson, former starting quarterback for Penn State.
 Freddie Solomon, NFL wide receiver, Miami Dolphins and San Francisco 49ers.
 John Stefero, former catcher for the Baltimore Orioles.
 Derrick Witherspoon. NFL, running back & return specialist. 
Aviation & Space
 David A. King, former director of NASA Marshall Space Flight Center, Huntsville, Alabama
Beauty Pageant Winners
 Shawn Weatherly, Miss South Carolina USA, Miss USA, and Miss Universe (1980).
Business
 Samuel R. Allen, chairman and CEO of John Deere.
 Thomas Wilson (Industrialist), born in Scotland & becoming a prominent businessman, he was the wealthiest man in S. C. when he died.
Criminal Accusations
 Mark Orrin Barton, perpetrator of the 1999 Atlanta day trading firm shootings; a Sumter High School class of 1973 graduate.
 Robert Henry Best, Nazi broadcaster convicted of treason in 1948 and sentenced to life imprisonment.
 William Pierce confessed (and was convicted) to the 1970 murder of the daughter ("Peg" Cuttino) of state senator, James Cuttino, Jr.; but "Pee Wee" Gaskins (Donald Henry Gaskins) also claimed that he killed her.
 George Stinney, youngest American at 14 to be executed. He was African-American, and wrongfully convicted of murdering two white girls.
Education/Scholarship
 Glen Browder, history professor, former Alabama Congressman, and co-author of the 2018 book, South Carolina's Turkish People.
 Gloria Conyers Hewitt, mathematician.
 William Ephraim Mikell (1868–1944), dean of the University of Pennsylvania Law School.
Heroism
 Clarke Bynum (and Gifford M. Shaw) saved 300+ lives thwarting a passenger attempt to crash British Airways Flight 2069 12/29/2000.
 Robert F. Morel, II, recipient of Carnegie Medal for heroism award in 1990 for rescuing a police officer.
Military
 Charles J. Girard, brigadier general, one of highest ranking American officers to die in battle during   Vietnam War.
 The Citadel Cadet George Edward "Tuck" Haynsworth, who fired the first shot of the American Civil War, was born and raised in Sumter and is buried there.
 Major General George L. Mabry Jr., Medal of Honor recipient, second-most decorated soldier of World War II.
 Emile P. Moses, major general in the Marine Corps.
 Lt. Ervin David Shaw, WWI pilot and namesake of Shaw Air Force Base.
Motion Picture, Acting & TV
 Ryan Buell, founder of Penn State Paranormal Research Society; has a reality series on A&E, Paranormal State.
 Virginia Capers, Tony Award-winning actress.
 O'Neal Compton, actor, writer, photographer, commercial filmmaker.
 Nancy O'Dell, television personality, anchor of Entertainment Tonight.
 Jay Ellis, actor, Top Gun: Maverick.
Music
 Lee Brice, country music singer-songwriter.
 Rob Crosby, country music artist, singer, and songwriter.
 Ray "Stingray" Davis, founding member of The Parliaments, Parliament and Funkadelic.
 Clara Louise Kellogg, opera singer.
Law and Politicians
 Charlotta Bass, first black female to run for VP with the Progressive Party in 1952 & born in Sumter.
 Frank Bradford, politician and lawyer
 Jim Clyburn, politician, U.S. Representative House Majority Whip for 110th Congress.
 Marcia G. Cooke, U.S. District Court judge
 Charles Alexander Harvin, state legislator.
 Bubba McElveen, Sumter mayor and the first civilian to be named honorary chief master sergeant of the U.S. Air Force.
 Joe McElveen, Sumter's longest-serving mayor (2000-2020).
 Ramon Schwartz Jr., member of S. C. State Legislature & some years as Speaker of the House.
 Martha Priscilla Shaw, mayor of Sumter (1952–1956), first female mayor in South Carolina.
 Angelica Singleton Van Buren, acting First Lady of the United States during the presidency of Martin Van Buren.

Sister Cities
 Taichung City, Taiwan

See also 
 List of municipalities in South Carolina

References

External links

 
 
 Sumter Chamber of Commerce

 
Cities in Sumter County, South Carolina
County seats in South Carolina
Populated places established in 1845
1845 establishments in South Carolina